Terror Illustrated was a black-and-white magazine published by EC Comics in late 1955 and early 1956. Part of EC's Picto-Fiction line, each magazine featured three to five stories. The format alternated blocks of text with several illustrations per page.

The first issue appeared with a cover date of November–December 1955, but the second issue was the last. A third issue existed but was not printed by EC. The Picto-Fiction magazines lost money from the start, and the line was cancelled when EC's distributor went bankrupt.

Terror Illustrated was edited by Al Feldstein. As with EC's comics, Feldstein was the most prolific writer of the title, and generally wrote up to three stories per issue. In addition to the stories credited to him, Feldstein also wrote under the pseudonyms Maxwell Williams and Alfred E. Neuman. Feldstein included multiple retellings of previous stories, a move suggested by publisher William Gaines. This included "The Basket" and "The Gorilla's Paw" in the first issue and "Horror in the Freak Tent" and "Reflection of Death" in #2. Other contributing writers included Jack Oleck (who had worked as a writer on EC's earlier publications) and John Larner.

Featured illustrators included Reed Crandall, Joe Orlando, George Evans, Graham Ingels, Johnny Craig, Charles Sultan and Jack Davis.

In 2006 Terror Illustrated was reprinted along with the other Picto-Fiction magazines by publisher Russ Cochran (with Gemstone Publishing) in hardbound volumes as the final part of his Complete EC Library. The reprint volume included the previously unpublished third issue of Terror Illustrated.

Issue guide

References

EC Comics publications
Magazines established in 1955
Magazines disestablished in 1956
Defunct magazines published in the United States
Fiction magazines
1955 establishments in the United States